The women's 400 metres hurdles event at the 2019 European Athletics U23 Championships was held in Gävle, Sweden, at Gavlehov Stadium Park on 12, 13 and 14 July.

Medalists

Result

Heats
Qualification: First 3 in each heat (Q) and next 4 fastest (q) qualified for the semifinals.

Semifinals
Qualification: First 3 in each heat (Q) and next 2 fastest (q) qualified for the final.

Final

References

400
400 metres hurdles at the European Athletics U23 Championships